The 14th Olonets Infantry Regiment was an infantry regiment of the Russian Empire's Imperial Russian Army. It took part in wars against the Ottoman Empire and the First French Empire (1813–1814), as well as conflicts in Poland (1831 and 1863), Hungary (1849) and the Crimea.

References 

 
 

Infantry regiments of the Russian Empire
Łomża Governorate
Military units and formations established in 1798
Military units and formations disestablished in 1918